Omar Jouma Bilal Al-Salfa, (born 15 October 1989) is a track and field athlete from the United Arab Emirates who competes in sprinting events. He was a gold medallist at the 2009 Asian Athletics Championships and represented his country at the 2008 Beijing Olympics.

He made his first appearances at major competitions in 2007: he took the bronze medal over 200 metres at the Military World Games in October and then came fourth at the Pan Arab Games with a national record-breaking run of 20.94 seconds. He turned to the indoor circuit at the start of the following season and came fourth at the 2008 Asian Indoor Athletics Championships with a national record of 6.81 seconds for the 60 metres. He was selected for the 2008 IAAF World Indoor Championships and ran in the heats.

Outdoors he set a national junior record of 10.53 seconds to take the 100 metres title at that year's Arab Junior Championships that, and also went on to win the 200 m gold medal. At the 2008 Asian Junior Athletics Championships he took the gold in the 200 m. He reached the 200 m final at the 2008 World Junior Championships in Athletics and gained a place on the Olympic team for the 2008 Summer Olympics, where he competed in the heats stage of the event.

He improved his 200 m record to 20.72 seconds with a win at the Gulf Championships in May 2009. He competed at the 2009 World Championships in Athletics and reached the quarter-finals on his debut appearance at the competition. A fourth-place finish over 60 m at the 2009 Asian Indoor Games (with a personal best of 6.72 seconds) was followed by a bronze medal with the Emirati team in the 4×400 metres relay. Al-Salfa won his first major senior title at the 2009 Asian Athletics Championships, just dipping ahead of Shinji Takahira of Japan to win the Asian 200 m title. In 2010 he made his first appearance on the IAAF Diamond League circuit running a wind-assisted 10.35 seconds in the 100 m at the Qatar Athletic Super Grand Prix in Doha. He claimed the 200 m bronze medal behind Nigerian-born Femi Ogunode and Japan's Kenji Fujimitsu at the 2010 Asian Games.

Major competition record

References

1989 births
Living people
Emirati male sprinters
Olympic athletes of the United Arab Emirates
Athletes (track and field) at the 2008 Summer Olympics
Asian Games medalists in athletics (track and field)
Athletes (track and field) at the 2010 Asian Games
World Athletics Championships athletes for the United Arab Emirates
Asian Games bronze medalists for the United Arab Emirates
Medalists at the 2010 Asian Games